The 1976 Intercontinental Cup was an association football tie held over two legs in November and December 1976 between Cruzeiro, winners of the 1976 Copa Libertadores, and the winners of the 1975–76 European Cup, Bayern Munich.

FC Bayern Munich, even as European champions, didn't find a compatible schedule together with South-American champions Club Atlético Independiente, to play the 1975 Intercontinental Cup. This time, however, had no problems and the German club disputed the world title against the 1976 South-American champions, the Brazilian Cruzeiro Esporte Clube.

The team of Bavaria held the base of the German team who won the 1974 FIFA World Cup, with players like Sepp Maier, Franz Beckenbauer, Karl-Heinz Rummenigge and Gerd Müller. Cruzeiro was the first Brazilian club to become champion of the Copa Libertadores after Pelé's Santos FC. The team had the 1970 FIFA World Cup champions Wilson Piazza and Jairzinho, and other famous players like Nelinho, Raul Plassmann and Dirceu Lopes.

The first leg was held on 23 November 1976 at the Munich Olympic Stadium, home of Bayern. The match finished as a 2–0 victory for the home side, in a game with the pitch covered by snow. The goals were scored by Gerd Müller and Jupp Kapellmann.

Estádio Governador Magalhães Pinto, known as Mineirão, hosted the return leg on 21 December 1976. The match finished drawn by 0–0.

Match summary 
Bayern entertained their Brazilian visitors for the first leg of the Intercontinental Cup on 23 November 1976 . The ground staff chose to tackle a thick layer of snow blanketing the Olympic stadium pitch with jets of water, but the unwise measure only made matters worse and the playing surface almost literally resembled an ice rink. Despite the arctic conditions, a 20,000 crowd made their way to the ground only to witness Cruzeiro Belo Horizonte turn in the livelier display. The home rearguard held firm before Gerd Müller claimed a typical poacher's goal to launch Bayern on the road to victory. The prolific goalscorer converted Uli Hoeness' lay-off for the opener ten minutes from time, before Jupp Kapellmann doubled the advantage two minutes later.

Munich travelled to Brazil for the return three days before Christmas. Jet-lagged and after only four hours in bed, the German team stepped out into the incredible atmosphere generated by a 117,000 crowd seeking to defend their aggregate lead. Keeper Sepp Maier and libero Franz Beckenbauer were in outstanding form and the Bavarians came away with a trophy-winning goalless draw.

Key player 
To this day, the bars of Munich resound to lively debate over the relative merits of Franz Beckenbauer and Gerd Müller, the one a consummate strategist, the other an utterly ruthless goalscorer. The "Kaiser", the embodiment of the long-lost art of the all-seeing, visionary libero position, was the single most important influence on Bayern's playing philosophy in this era, but he could never have assembled such an illustrious medal collection without Müller's extraordinary striking prowess, neatly summed up in the finish which put the Reds a goal up in the first leg. Uli Hoeness' lay-off appeared a shade too long on the slippery turf, but Müller stretched and somehow reached the ball with his left foot. However, knowing he was almost certain to lose his footing on the Olympic stadium ice, he somehow pulled off the amazing feat of dragging the ball behind him, spinning and finding the bottom corner with his right foot. Müller managed all this in a single movement, for otherwise he would have lost his balance and missed the chance.

Coach 
The German footballing public knew Dettmar Cramer as "Napoleon". Franz Beckenbauer reverently addressed him as the "Professor", a mark of respect the Kaiser still uses today. Cramer led Bayern to European Champions Cup success on two occasions before the victory over Cruzeiro Belo Horizonte, and thus rates as one of the most successful coaches in the club's history. Cramer, who coached in an astonishing 90 different countries before and after his time in Bavaria and holds the German Federal Order of Merit and two honorary professorships, claimed to have learned one over-arching truth during a richly diverse career: "I've learnt no-one can tell whether somebody's a good or bad person just because he's black, white, yellow, red or green."

First leg

Match details

Second leg

Match details

See also
FC Bayern Munich in international football competitions

References

External links
Intercontinental Cup 1976
Match details and lineups at RSSSF.com

1976–77 in European football
1976 in South American football
1976–77 in German football
1976 in Brazilian football
1976
1976
1976
FC Bayern Munich matches
Cruzeiro Esporte Clube matches
November 1976 sports events in Europe
December 1976 sports events in Europe
1970s in Munich
1976 in West German sport
Sports competitions in Munich